Emmett Joseph Cleary (born April 27, 1990) is a former American football offensive tackle of the National Football League (NFL). He played college football at Boston College, and signed with the Indianapolis Colts as an undrafted free agent in 2013. He has also played for the Tampa Bay Buccaneers, Oakland Raiders, Cincinnati Bengals, New York Giants, Dallas Cowboys, and Detroit Lions. Cleary retired from football in 2018 to pursue medicine at USC Keck. He graduated in 2022 and is currently training in Orthopedic Surgery residency at the Mayo Clinic in Rochester, MN.

Early years
Cleary was born in Tokyo, Japan, but moved to the United States where he first learned football. He graduated from St. Viator High School, where he was called "The Asian Sensation" by students.

As a senior, he was a two-way player at offensive tackle and defensive end. He received honorable-mention All-state, two-time All-East Suburban Catholic Conference, Daily Herald Northwest Suburban All-Area and ESCC Co-Offensive Lineman of the Year honors. He was named an Illinois State Scholar and a National Merit finalist.

College career
Cleary accepted a football scholarship from Boston College. As a redshirt freshman, he was a backup at offensive tackle and appeared in 12 games.

As a sophomore, he began the season as a backup until starter Rich Lapham was injured, which contributed to establishing himself the starter at right tackle for the last five games.

As a junior, he started all 12 games at right tackle. As a senior, he switched sides with John Wetzel and was named the starter at left tackle.

Professional career - Football

Indianapolis Colts
Cleary was signed as an undrafted free agent by the Indianapolis Colts after the 2013 NFL Draft on April 30. After competing for a roster spot during training camp, he was waived/injured (undisclosed) on September 5.

Tampa Bay Buccaneers
On October 16, 2013, Cleary was signed by the Tampa Bay Buccaneers to their practice squad.  He signed a reserve/future contract on January 6, 2014. He was released on June 17.

Oakland Raiders
On June 18, 2014, he was claimed off waivers by the Oakland Raiders. He was released on August 24.

Cincinnati Bengals
On September 16, 2014, he was added to the Cincinnati Bengals practice squad.

New York Giants
On January 13, 2015, Cleary signed a reserve/future contract with the New York Giants. He was waived on September 5. On September 6, he was signed to the Giants' practice squad. On November 16, he was elevated to the active roster. On September 6, 2016, he was waived/injured (finger).

Dallas Cowboys
On September 28, 2016, Cleary was signed by the Dallas Cowboys to be the reserve swing tackle and replace an injured Chaz Green. He played only on special teams until Week 16 against the Detroit Lions, where he replaced an injured Tyron Smith at left tackle in the third quarter. He started at left tackle in the season finale against the Philadelphia Eagles in place of an injured Smith.

In 2017, he was passed on the depth chart by Byron Bell during training camp and was waived on September 2.

Detroit Lions
On September 12, 2017, Cleary was signed by the Detroit Lions.

Cleary announced his retirement from the NFL on April 10, 2018. On May 13, 2018, he announced his plans to attend medical school in fall 2018 at USC.

Professional career - Medicine

USC Keck

Mayo Clinic

References

External links

Boston College bio

1990 births
Living people
Players of American football from Compton, California
American football offensive tackles
Boston College Eagles football players
Indianapolis Colts players
Tampa Bay Buccaneers players
Oakland Raiders players
Cincinnati Bengals players
New York Giants players
Dallas Cowboys players
Detroit Lions players